Chumalu (also Romanized as Chūmālū; also known as Chomalu, Chormāl, Chormālū, and Chūmānlū) is a village in Qareh Poshtelu-e Pain Rural District, Qareh Poshtelu District, Zanjan County, Zanjan Province, Iran. At the 2006 census, its population was 382, in 70 families. The village is the site of epithermal metal deposits, part of the Tarom-Hashtjin Metallogenic Province, and evidence of "ancient workings and dumps" have been found near hydrothermal veins. The total deposits are estimated at 0.2 megatonnes of lead, zinc, copper, gold, and silver ores. There is a high content of silver and base metals, and a high silver-to-gold ratio. The main gangue minerals are quartz, fluorite, rhodochrosite, and calcite. Other features of the Chumalu deposit include crustiform banding, breccia formation, vuggy textures, and the presence of "pyrite, sphalerite, galena, tetrahedrite, chalcopyrite, minor arsenopyrite, and abundant zinc-manganese-iron carbonate minerals".

References 

Populated places in Zanjan County